is the 12th single by Japanese girl group SKE48, released in Japan on July 17, 2013.

Track listing

Type-A

Type-B

Type-C

Theater Edition

Member

"Utsukushii Inazuma" 
(Center: Jurina Matsui, Rena Matsui)
 Team S: Anna Ishida, Masana Ōya, Yuria Kizaki, Sayaka Niidoi, Jurina Matsui, Manatsu Mukaida, Miki Yakata
 Team KII: Mina Ōba, Akari Suda, Akane Takayanagi, Airi Furukawa
 Team E: Yukiko Kinoshita, Kanon Kimoto, Nanako Suga, Nao Furuhata, Rena Matsui

"Jyuri-Jyuri Baby" 
Team S
 Team S: Riho Abiru, Anna Ishida, Kyōka Isohara, Yūna Ego, Masana Ōya, Yuria Kizaki, Risako Gotō, Makiko Saitō, Seira Satō, Rika Tsuzuki, Aki Deguchi, Yūka Nakanishi, Sayaka Niidoi, Jurina Matsui, Manatsu Mukaida, Miki Yakata

"Through the Night" 
Selection 8
 Team S: Seira Satō, Aki Deguchi
 Team KII: Mai Takeuchi, Haruka Futamura
 Team E: Tsugumi Iwanaga, Shiori Kaneko, Momona Kitō, Nanako Suga

"Futari dake no Parade" 
Team KII
 Team KII: Mikoto Uchiyama, Tomoko Katō, Rumi Katō, Mina Ōba, Ami Kobayashi, Mieko Satō, Aya Shibata, Akari Suda, Yumana Takagi, Akane Takayanagi, Mai Takeuchi, Haruka Futamura, Airi Furukawa, Rina Matsumoto, Yukari Yamashita

"Seishun no Mizushibuki" 
Boat Pier Senbatsu
 Team S: Masana Ōya, Miki Yakata
 Team KII: Akari Suda, Akane Takayanagi, Airi Furukawa
 Team E: Rena Matsui
 Kenkyūsei: Matsumura Kaori

"Shalala na Calendar" 
Team E
 Team E: Rion Azuma, Shiori Iguchi, Narumi Ichino, Tsugumi Iwanaga, Madoka Umemoto, Shiori Kaneko, Momona Kitō, Yukiko Kinoshita, Kanon Kimoto, Mei Sakai, Nanako Suga, Nao Furuhata, Rena Matsui, Honoka Mizuno, Ami Miyamae, Reika Yamada

"Band wo Yarou yo" 
Magical Band
 Team S: Yuria Kizaki
 Team KII: Akane Takayanagi
 Team E: Kanon Kimoto
 AKB48 Team K: Rie Kitahara
 Former members: Shiori Ogiso, Sawako Hata, Kumi Yagami

"Yuudachi no Mae" 
Kenkyūsei
Kenkyūsei: Kaori Matsumura, Asana Inuzuka, Arisa Ōwaki, Risa Ogino, Mizuho Yamada, Aoki Shiori, Reona Ida, Akane Ito, Aisa Orito, Natsuki Kamata, Ryōha Kitagawa, Ruka Kitano, Yuna Kitahara, Haruka Kumazaki, Mayuko Gotō, Yuka Sasaki, Miyuka Sora, Saki Takeuchi, Yume Noguchi, Yuzuki Hidaka, Azuki Yano, Juna Yamada, Yuka Yamamoto

Oricon Charts

References

External links 
 SKE48 Discography
 Type-A
 Limited Edition
 Regular Edition
 Type-B
 Limited Edition
 Regular Edition
 Type-C
 Limited Edition
 Regular Edition
 Theater Edition

2013 singles
Japanese-language songs
Songs with lyrics by Yasushi Akimoto
SKE48 songs
Avex Trax singles
2013 songs